Odontophrynus americanus (common names: common lesser escuercito, American ground frog) is a species of frog in the family Odontophrynidae.
It is found in central and northern Argentina, Uruguay, southern Brazil, and southern Paraguay. It is tetraploid; diploid populations have been described as a new species, Odontophrynus cordobae.

Odontophrynus americanus is common throughout much of its range. It occurs in open grasslands and savannas. It is a fossorial species, but during the breeding season, these frogs are found at shallow, temporary ponds and flooded areas. Males can be heard calling at night from the edge of, or from within the water. The species tolerates substantial habitat disturbance and no significant threats have been identified.

References

americanus
Amphibians of Argentina
Amphibians of Brazil
Amphibians of Paraguay
Amphibians of Uruguay
Taxonomy articles created by Polbot
Amphibians described in 1841
Taxa named by André Marie Constant Duméril
Taxa named by Gabriel Bibron